William Albert Boucher (November 12, 1889 in St. Louis, Northwest Territories – June 23, 1976) was a Métis politician, farmer and merchant.

He was born in St. Louis in what is now Saskatchewan but was, at the time, part of the North West Territories. His brother-in-law was Saskatchewan Liberal MLA Arthur Jules Marion.

He was elected to the House of Commons of Canada as a Member of the Liberal Party in 1948 to represent the riding of Rosthern after the resignation of Walter Adam Tucker on June 8, 1948 and a by-election next October 25. He won the election of 1949. He did not run for re-election in 1953.

In 1957, Boucher was then appointed to the senate on the advice of Prime Minister Louis St. Laurent and represented the Senate division of Prince Albert, Saskatchewan until his death. During his tenure in the Senate, he was a member of numerous Senate committees including the Standing Committees on Rules and Orders, External Relations, Immigration and Labour, Natural Resources, and on Public Health and Welfare, as well as the Special Committee on Criminal Code (Hate Propaganda).

References

External links
 

1889 births
1976 deaths
Canadian senators from Saskatchewan
Farmers from Saskatchewan
Liberal Party of Canada MPs
Liberal Party of Canada senators
Members of the House of Commons of Canada from Saskatchewan
Indigenous Canadian senators
Métis politicians
Canadian Métis people
Indigenous Members of the House of Commons of Canada
Canadian merchants